Atıf Yılmaz Batıbeki (9 December 1925 – 5 May 2006) was a renowned Turkish film director, screenwriter, and film producer. He was very much a legend in the film industry of Turkey with 119 movies directed. He also wrote 53 screenplays and produced 28 movies since 1951. He was active in almost every period of the Turkish film industry.

Early life 
Atıf Yılmaz was born on 9 December 1925 in Mersin, Turkey to a Kurdish family originally from Palu. After finishing high school in Mersin, he attended the Law School of Istanbul University. Because of his interest in arts, he dropped out of Law School and entered the Painting Department of the Academy of Fine Arts in Istanbul. After graduating from the Academy, he did some painting works in workshops. His education in painting helped him when he was directing his movies, as he once remarked.

Film career 
In the beginning, he worked as a film critic, made paintings and wrote film scripts to earn a living. After co-directing two movies as an assistant director to Semih Evin in 1950, his directing career began with the film Kanlı Feryat (The Bloody Cry). In 1960, he established his film company "Yerli Film" with the actor Orhan Günşıray.

The most important movies in his filmography were: Hıçkırık (The Sob), Alageyik (The Fallow Deer), Suçlu (The Guilty One), Seni Kaybedersem (If I Lose You), Yaban Gülü (The Wild Rose), Keşanlı Ali Destanı (Kesanli Ali's Epic), Taçsız Kral (The Crownless King), Toprağın Kanı (Blood of the Earth), Ölüm Tarlası (Death Field), Utanç (The Shame), Zavallılar (The Poor People), Selvi Boylum, Al Yazmalım (My Girl with the Red Scarf), Baskin (The Raid), Adak (The Sacrifice), Bir Yudum Sevgi (A Sip of Love), Adı Vasfiye (Her Name is Vasfiye), Berdel, Düş Gezginleri (Walking After Midnight), Eylül Fırtınası (After the Fall) and Mine.

He made movies that were both fluent and had mainly social messages. Most of the themes of his movies were taboo when they were produced. Particularly "Mine" and "Her Name is Vasfiye" were both revolutionary at the time of their release with themes regarding sexuality and the reaction of society.

He never gave up making movies throughout his life and even in the time when the industry stopped filmmaking due to economic reasons.

Atıf Yılmaz played an important role in the professional career of notable Turkish film directors like Halit Refiğ, Yılmaz Güney, Şerif Gören, Zeki Ökten and Ali Özgentürk.

During the Antalya Film Festival in September 2005, he was admitted to hospital with gastro-intestinal complaints. He died on 5 May 2006 in Istanbul.

Filmography

Director 

 Kanlı Feryad (The Bloody Cry) - 1951
 Mezarımı Taştan Oyun - 1951
 İki Kafadar Deliler Pansiyonunda - 1952
 Aşk Izdırabtır - 1953
 Hıçkırık (The Sob) - 1953
 Şimal Yıldızı (The North Star) - 1954
 Kadın Severse (If a Woman Loves) - 1955
 Dağları Bekleyen Kız (The Girl Who Watched the Mountains) - 1955
 İlk Ve Son (The First and the Last) - 1955
 Beş Hasta Var (There Are Five Patients) - 1956
 Gelinin Muradı - 1957
 Bir Şoförün Gizli Defteri - 1958
 Yaşamak Hakkımdır - 1958
 Kumpanya - 1958
 Karacaoğlan'ın Kara Sevdası - 1959
 Bu Vatanın Çocukları (This Land's Children) - 1959
 Ala Geyik (The Fallow Deer) - 1959
 Ayşecik Şeytan Çekici (Aysecik: Bright Kid) - 1960
 Suçlu (The Guilty One) - 1960
 Dolandırıcılar Şahı (The King of Swindlers) - 1960
 Ölüm Perdesi (The Death Curtain) - 1960
 Seni Kaybedersem (If I Lose You) - 1961
 Tatlı Bela (The Sweet Calamity) - 1961
 Kızıl Vazo (The Red Vase) - 1961
 Allah Cezanı Versin Osman Bey - 1961
 Battı Balık - 1962
 Beş Kardeştiler - 1962
 Bir Gecelik Gelin - 1962
 Cengiz Han'ın Hazineleri (Treasures of Genghis Khan) - 1962
 İki Gemi Yanyana (Two Ships, Side by Side) - 1963
 Azrailin Habercisi (The Messenger of Death) - 1963
 Yarın Bizimdir - 1963
 Kalbe Vuran Düşman - 1964
 Keşanlı Ali Destanı (Kesanli Ali's Epic) - 1964
 Erkek Ali - 1964
 Sayılı Dakikalar - 1965
 Hep O Şarkı - 1965
 Taçsız Kral (The Crownless King) - 1965
 Murat'ın Türküsü - 1965
 Sevgilim Bir Artistti - 1966
 Toprağın Kanı (The Blood of the Earth) - 1966
 Ah Güzel İstanbul (Oh Beautiful Istanbul) - 1966
 Ölüm Tarlası (The Death Field) - 1966]
 Pembe Kadın - 1966
 Harun Reşid'ın Gözdesi - 1967
 Balatlı Arif - 1967
 Kozanoğlu - 1967
 Yasemin'ın Tatlı Aşkı - 1968
 Cemile - 1968
 Köroğlu - 1968
 Kızıl Vazo - 1969
 Kölen Olayım - 1969
 Menekşe Gözler - 1969
 Aşktan da Üstün - 1970
 Zeyno - 1970
 Kara Gözlüm - 1970
 Darıldın Mı Cicim Bana - 1970
 Battal Gazi Destanı - 1971
 Ateş Parçası - 1971

 Unutulan Kadın - 1971
 Yedi Kocalı Hürmüz - 1971
 Güllü - 1972
 Cemo - 1972
 Utanç (Shame) - 1972
 Köle - 1972
 Zulüm - 1972
 Gelinlik Kızlar - 1972
 Günahsızlar - 1972
 Kambur - 973
 Güllü Geliyor Güllü - 1973
 Mevlana - 1973
 Zavallılar (The Poor People orThe Suffering Ones) - 1974
 Kuma - 1974
 Salako - 1974
 İşte Hayat - 1975
 Çapkın Hırsız - 1975
 Deli Yusuf - 1975
 Hasip İle Nasip - 1976
 Baş Belası - 1976
 Tuzak - 1976
 Mağlup Edilemeyenler - 1976
 Baskın (The Raid) - 1977
 Yangın - 1977
 Selvi Boylum, Al Yazmalım (My Girl with the Red Scarf) - 1977
 Acı Hatıralar - 1977
 Güllüşah İle İbo - 1977
 Seyahatname - 1977
 Kibar Feyzo - 1978]
 Minik Serçe (The Little Sparrow) - 1978
 Köşeyi Dönen Adam - 1978
 İnsan Avcısı (Heart of a Father) - 1979
 Adak (The Sacrifice) - 1979
 N'Olacak Şimdi - 1979
 Talihli Amele - 1980
 Deli Kan - 1981
 Dolap Beygiri - 1982
 Mine - 1983
 Seni Seviyorum - 1983
 Şekerpare - 1983
 Bir Yudum Sevgi (A Sip of Love) - 1984
 Dağınık Yatak - 1984
 Adı Vasfiye (Her Name is Vasfiye) - 1985
 Dul Bir Kadın - 1985
 Asiye Nasıl Kurtulur - 1986
 (The Windmill) - 1986
 Aaahh Belinda - 1986
 Kadının Adı Yok - 1987
 Hayallerim, Aşkım Ve Sen - 1987
 Devil, My Friend - 1988
 Ölü Bir Deniz - 1989
 Berdel - 1990
 Bekle Dedim Gölgeye - 1990
 Safiyedir Kızın Adı - 1991
 Walking After Midnight - 1992
 Tatlı Betüş - 1993
 Gece, Melek Ve Bizim Çocuklar - 1993
 Yer Çekimli Aşklar - 1995
 Nihavend Mucize - 1997
 Eylül Fırtınası (After the Fall) - 1999
 Eğreti Gelin - 2004

Producer 

 Dolandırıcılar Şahı (The King of Swindlers) - 1960
 Seni Kaybedersem (If I Lose You) - 1961
 Allah Cezanı Versin Osman Bey - 1961
 Cengiz Han'ın Hazineleri (Treasures of Genghis Khan) - 1962
 Azrailin Habercisi (The Messenger of Death) - 1963]
 Yarın Bizimdir - 1963
 Toprağın Kanı (The Blood of the Earth) - 1966
 Maden - 1978
 Minik Serçe - 1978
 Adak - 1979
 Talihli Amele - 1980

 Deli Kan - 1981
 Göl - 1982
 Mine - 1982
 Seni Seviyorum - 1983
 Bir Yudum Sevgi - 1984
 Asiye Nasıl Kurtulur - 1986
 Ölü Bir Deniz - 1989
 İçimizden Biri: Yunus Emre (TV) - 1989
 Safiyedir Kızın Adı - 1991
 Düş Gezginleri - 1992
 Mozaik - 1992
 Gece, Melek Ve Bizim Çocuklar - 1993
 Nihavend Mucize - 1997
 Eylül Fırtınası (After the Fall) - 1999
 Sıdıka - 2000
 Şıh Senem - 2003

Screenwriter 

 Kanlı Feryad - 1951
 İki Kafadar Deliler Pansiyonunda - 1952
 Aşk Izdırabtır - 1953
 Hıçkırık - 1953
 Dağları Bekleyen Kız - 1955
 İlk Ve Son - 1955
 Kadın Severse - 1955
 Beş Hasta Var - 1956
 Gelinin Muradı - 1957
 Bir Şoförün Gizli Defteri - 1958
 Çoban Kızı - 1958
 Kumpanya - 1958
 Yaşamak Hakkımdır - 1958
 Üç Arkadaş - 1958
 Bu Vatanın Çocukları - 1959]
 Ala Geyik - 1959
 Karacaoğlan'ın Kara Sevdası - 1959
 Şoför Nebahat - 1960
 Ateşten Damla - 1960]
 Suçlu - 1960
 Seni Kaybedersem - 1961
 Yaban Gülü - 1961
 İki Gemi Yanyana - 1963
 Öp Annemin Elini - 1964
 Keşanlı Ali Destanı - 1964
 Murat'ın Türküsü - 1965

 Yasemin'ın Tatlı Aşkı - 1968
 Kızıl Vazo - 1969
 Ateş Parçası - 1971
 Battal Gazi Destanı - 1971
 Zavallılar - 1974
 Kuma - 1974
 Deli Yusuf - 1975
 Mağlup Edilemeyenler - 1976
 Güllüşah İle İbo - 1977
 Minik Serçe - 1978
 N'Olacak Şimdi - 1979
 Zübük - 1980
 Deli Kan - 1981
 Mine - 1982
 Dolap Beygiri - 1982
 Bir Yudum Sevgi - 1984
 Dul Bir Kadın - 1985
 Asiye Nasıl Kurtulur - 1986
 Kadının Adı Yok - 1987
 Arkadaşım Şeytan - 1988
 Ölü Bir Deniz - 1989
 Berdel - 1990
 Safiyedir Kızın Adı - 1991
 Düş Gezginleri - 1992
 Tatlı Betüş - 1993
 Eğreti Gelin - 2004

Awards

Prizes 

 Society of Journalists Turkish Film Festival, 1959, This Land's Children, Best Director
 2nd Antalya Golden Orange Film Festival, 1965, Kesanli Ali's Epic, Best Director
 2nd Antalya Golden Orange Film Festival, 1965, Kesanli Ali's Epic, Runner-Up Film
 9th Antalya Golden Orange Film Festival, 1972, Zulüm, Best Director
 13th Antalya Golden Orange Film Festival, 1976, Deli Yusuf, Best Director
 15th Antalya Golden Orange Film Festival, 1978, My Girl with the Red Scarf, Best Director
 21st Antalya Golden Orange Film Festival, 1984, A Sip of Love, Best Director
 Istanbul International Film Festival, 1985, A Sip of Love, Best Turkish Film of the Year
 Istanbul International Film Festival, 1986, Her Name is Vasfiye, Best Turkish Film of the Year
 23rd Antalya Golden Orange Film Festival, 1986, Ah! Belinda, Best Director
 10th Istanbul International Film Festival, 1991, Honorary Award
 Valencia Festival of Mediterranean Cinema, 1991, Berdel, Golden Palm for Best Film
 6th Adana Altın Koza Film Festival, 1992, Berdel, Runner-Up Film
 33rd Antalya Golden Orange Film Festival, 1996, Honour of Lifetime Award
 14th Moscow International Film Festival, 1985, Golden Prize nomination (Mine)

Honorary doctorate 

 1991 Hacettepe University

Books 

 Söylemek Güzeldir, Afa Yayınları, May 1995
 Bir Sinemacının Anıları, Doğan Kitapçılık, January 2002

References

External links 

 
 Sabancı University School of Languages Podcasts - Farewell to a filmmaker: Atıf Yılmaz
 Turkish Daily News - Farewell to Master of the Masters

1925 births
Turkish film directors
Turkish male screenwriters
Turkish film producers
Turkish people of Kurdish descent
Turkish Kurdish people
2006 deaths
Best Director Golden Orange Award winners
Golden Orange Life Achievement Award winners
Deaths from cancer in Turkey
People from Mersin
Kurdish atheists
20th-century screenwriters
Istanbul University Faculty of Law alumni